The 41st Ohio General Assembly first convened on December 5, 1842. The 36 members of the Ohio Senate and the 72 members of the Ohio House of Representatives were elected during the General Election of October 1842.

Leadership

Senate 

 Speaker of the Senate
 James J. Faran (D-Cincinnati)

House of Representatives 

 Speaker of the House
 John Chaney (D-Fairfield)

Members

Senate

House of Representatives

Standing committees

Senate

House

Notes

References 

Ohio legislative sessions
1840s in Ohio
1842 U.S. legislative sessions